Capua euphona is a species of moth of the family Tortricidae. It is found in Australia.

References 

Tortricinae
Moths of Australia
Moths described in 1910